Jorge Ordaz Gargallo (born 1946) is a Spanish writer and geologist. Born in Barcelona, he lived and taught for many years at the University of Oviedo. As a fiction writer, he is best known for his novels Prima Donna, which was nominated for the Premio Herralde, and La perla del Oriente, nominated for the Premio Nadal.

References

1946 births
Living people
Spanish novelists
Writers from Barcelona
Date of birth missing (living people)
Academic staff of the University of Oviedo